Crossroads Bible College is a private undergraduate, Bible college located in Indianapolis, Indiana.

History 
Early in 1980, James S. Wells met with Rev. Ken Davis and Rev. Clint Kaufield to discuss establishing a Bible college in Indianapolis. Baptist Bible College of Indianapolis opened in the Fall of 1980 as an evening school. The school incorporated in 1981. Despite a lack of accreditation, they started to offer bachelor's degrees in 1983. In February 1999 the school established legal accreditation through the Accrediting Association of Bible Colleges, now the Association for Biblical Higher Education.

References

External links
Official website 

Universities and colleges in Indianapolis
Bible colleges
Educational institutions established in 1980
Association for Biblical Higher Education